The Luis A. Ferré United States Courthouse and Post Office Building (aka, Correo de la Calle Atocha) in Ponce, Puerto Rico, previously known as the U.S. Post Office and Court House, is a historic post office and courthouse facility of the United States, housing operations of the United States District Court for the District of Puerto Rico. It was the first U.S. postal office established in Puerto Rico.

The building was designed by the Office of the Supervising Architect under James A. Wetmore and was built in 1933. In 2003 it was renamed the Luis A. Ferré United States Courthouse and Post Office Building by an Act of the U.S. Congress. The building sits at the same location where the Ponce Trainway depot used to be. The building is located on the southwest corner of Atocha and Guadalupe streets, facing Calle Atocha. The building suffered a major fire on 5 March 2018 which totally disabled and halted all postal activity processing activities at the facility.

See also

 Puerto Rico on stamps

References

External links
 Historic Federal Courthouses page from the Federal Judicial Center
 Law Bill from Congress.
 The building structure suffering a totally destructive fire on 5 March 2018
 Luis Irizarry Pabon: Presto a desobediencia Civil para impedir demolition en Ponce Centro. Jensen Rodriguez Grafal. La Perla del Sur. Ponce, Puerto Rico. Year 38. Issue 1989. pp.4-5.  12-18 January 2022. Accessed 12 January 2022. Archived.

National Register of Historic Places in Ponce, Puerto Rico
Government buildings on the National Register of Historic Places in Puerto Rico
Government buildings completed in 1933
Courthouses on the National Register of Historic Places in Puerto Rico
Post office buildings on the National Register of Historic Places
1933 establishments in Puerto Rico